The Basmane-Tire Regional, numbered as B36, is a  regional rail service operated by the Turkish State Railways, between Basmane Terminal in İzmir and Tire. Four trains operate daily each way; trains 32415, 32417, 32413, 32419 operate southbound from Basmane to Tire, while trains 32412, 32416, 32418, 32420 operate northbound from Tire to Basmane. The route is the third-busiest regional route in district 3 after the Basmane-Ödemiş Regional and the Basmane-Denizli Regional.

Today the rolling stock that operates on the line are DM15000, MT5700 or M30000.

Regional rail in Turkey
Railway services introduced in 1883
1883 establishments in the Ottoman Empire
Transport in İzmir Province
İzmir
Tire District